Alison Ice Stream is an ice stream about  long flowing into Eltanin Bay south of Wirth Peninsula, Antarctica. It was named by the Advisory Committee on Antarctic Names after Alison Cook, a British Antarctic Survey computer specialist, part of the United States-United Kingdom cooperative project to compile glaciological and coastal change maps of the Antarctic Peninsula in the late 1990s and early 2000s.

See also
Ice stream

References 

Ice streams of Ellsworth Land